Ashley Modurotolu Banjo  is an English street dancer, choreographer and actor. He is the leader of dance troupe Diversity who won the third series of Britain's Got Talent. Banjo was a judge on the Sky1 talent show Got to Dance and co-presenter of the Saturday night BBC game show Can't Touch This. Since 2018, he has been a judge on Dancing on Ice.

Ashley replaced Simon Cowell, who was recovering from an electric motorcycle accident, as a judge on the ITV show Britain's Got Talent in September and October 2020 during the live-shows.

Early life and education
Son of former heavyweight boxer Funso Banjo and Danielle, Banjo was educated at the independent St John's School, Billericay, where he was Head Boy and still holds the high jump sports day record.

Diversity
In 2007, Ashley and his younger brother Jordan formed Swift Moves with nine of their friends, before later changing their name to Diversity. He was given the nickname 'Chosen' by his fellow Diversity members. In their first year together, they won the Street Dance Weekend 2007 competition before deciding to enter Britain's Got Talent.

Britain's Got Talent

After receiving "yes" votes from all three judges in their audition, Diversity went on to compete in the first semi-final on 24 May, losing the public vote-decided first place to Susan Boyle but winning the judges' vote against Natalie Okri. In the final six days later, Diversity were announced as the winners, beating Boyle and Julian Smith (who came second and third respectively). As winners of the competition, Diversity received £100,000 (around £9,090 per member) and went on to perform before Queen Elizabeth at the Royal Variety Show on 7 December 2009.

Post Britain's Got Talent

Subsequently, Diversity were nominated in the Dance section of the final South Bank Show awards and won an award at the Pride of Britain Awards

In 2013 Ashley choreographed a tour for Diversity called Limitless. The tour ran from 30 November to 16 December.

In 2021, Ashley partnered with detergent brand Persil and TV channel Sky Nature to make a series of short films highlighting environmental action.

Television work
Ashley was a judge on Sky1's dancing talent show Got to Dance for all five series. Diversity appeared as guest performers at least once every series. In total they did nine performances on the show. In 2015, he presented Perspectives: Michael Jackson's Thriller with Ashley Banjo.

In 2016, Banjo co-presented Can't Touch This, a Saturday night game show for BBC One, alongside Zoë Ball. In 2017, Banjo was a judge on the new ITV series Dance Dance Dance, presented by Alesha Dixon and Will Best.

Since January 2018, Banjo has been part of the judging panel on Dancing on Ice, starting with its tenth series in 2018.

In August 2020, it was announced that due to Simon Cowell's bike injury and recovery period, Banjo would replace Cowell for the live semi-final and final shows of the 14th series of Britain's Got Talent.

Filmography

Personal life 
After winning Britain's Got Talent in 2009, Banjo took a break from his schooling to concentrate on his dancing. He said that "from the age of 14, I started to teach myself routines". Banjo was in a thirteen-year relationship with Francesca Abbott, who is a member of another dance troupe called Out of the Shadows. They announced their engagement on 2 October 2014. Ashley and Francesa have two children, Rose (born 2019) and Micah (born 2020). Ashley and Francesca announced on 23 December 2022 that they had separated 18 months earlier.

Ashley Banjo is an Official Ambassador of the United Dance Organisation.

Banjo was appointed Member of the Order of the British Empire (MBE) in the 2022 New Year Honours for services to dance.

References

External links

Britain's Got Talent contestants
British hip hop dancers
English male dancers
Living people
1988 births
People from Leytonstone
English people of Nigerian descent
21st-century British dancers
Black British male actors
Black British television personalities
Members of the Order of the British Empire